Growing Up McGhee, formerly known as 6 Little McGhees (sometimes listed as Six Little McGhees) is an American reality television series that debuted on December 15, 2012, on the Oprah Winfrey Network (OWN) that is based on the popular 1960s song "Seven Little Girl's (Sitting in the Backseat, Kissing and Hugging with Freddie McGhee)

On June 8, 2016, the show returned on UP under the new title Growing Up McGhee airing on Wednesdays at 9 pm.

Premise
The series follows the day-to-day lives of Mia and Rozonno McGhee, along with their household, as they balance life between their six children, marriage and a family business. The McGhees own and operate a carpet and upholstery cleaning business in their hometown of Columbus, Ohio. The couple, who met while in high school, both come from deprived backgrounds; they both suffered emotional abuse and physical neglect. Rozonno grew up without any contact from his father and with a drug-addicted mother. When Mia was a teenager, her mother threw her out of the family home, forcing the girl to drop out of school to support herself. The McGhees were married for 10 years and suffered several failed pregnancies before they were able to become parents.

Cast

Parents

 Mia McGhee born November 19th 1980 (age 41)
 Rozonno (Ro) McGhee Sr.-born July 6th 1979 (age 42)

Sextuplets (oldest to youngest)
Sextuplets born June 9th 2010 (age 12)

 Rozonno Junior (RoRo) 
 Issac (Happy Feet)
 Josiah "Joey" (Joe Joe) 
 Madison (Maddie)                                                                              
 Elijah (Eli)
 Olivia "Liv" (Livvy)

Family and friends

 Charmayne aka Cilky Smooth, Rozonno's mother
 Frank, Rozonno's brother
 Cierra, Mia's niece
 Sonia, Mia's mother
 Tania, Mia's sister
 Cian, Mia's niece
 Yasmin, Mia's niece
 Antonsae aka Boogie, Kids' helper aunt 
 Amy, Volunteer Helper 
 Cieara, Mia's Friend 
 Luke, Manager

Episodes

Season 1 (2012–13)
The first season of 6 Little McGhees aired weekly on the Oprah Winfrey Network from December 15, 2012, to January 5, 2013.

Season 2 (2013)
The second season of 6 Little McGhees premiered on September 7, 2013, and concluded on October 26, 2013. Three previously unaired episodes were broadcast back-to-back on December 28, 2013.

Season 3 (2014)
Season 3 premiered on the Oprah Winfrey Network on Saturday September 6, 2014.

Awards and nominations

References

External links
 
 
 

2010s American reality television series
2012 American television series debuts
English-language television shows
Oprah Winfrey Network original programming
Television series about children
Television series about families
2014 American television series endings